Juan Ramírez de Arellano, O.P. (died 24 March 1609, in San Salvador, El Salvador) was a Roman Catholic prelate who served as Bishop of Santiago de Guatemala (1600–1609).

Biography
Juan Ramírez de Arellano was ordained a priest in the Order of Preachers. 
On 12 May 1600, he was appointed during the papacy of Pope Clement VIII as Bishop of Santiago de Guatemala. On 25 July 1600, he was consecrated bishop by Domenico Ginnasi, Archbishop of Manfredonia, with Juan Pedro González de Mendoza, Bishop Emeritus of Lipari, and Martín Vasquez de Arce, Bishop of Puerto Rico, serving as co-consecrators. He served as Bishop of Santiago de Guatemala until his death on 24 March 1609.

References

External links and additional sources
 (for Chronology of Bishops) 
 (for Chronology of Bishops) 

17th-century Roman Catholic bishops in Guatemala
Bishops appointed by Pope Clement VIII
1609 deaths
Dominican bishops
Roman Catholic bishops of Guatemala (pre-1743)